Florence station may refer to:

Florence Santa Maria Novella station, the main railway station in Florence.
Florence station (Amtrak), an Amtrak train station in Florence, South Carolina
Florence (Los Angeles Metro station)
Florence station (River Line), a River Line light rail station in Florence Township, New Jersey
Atlantic Coast Line Depot (Florence, South Carolina), a former train station in Florence, South Carolina

See also
Florence (disambiguation)